Sergio Tolento Hernández (born 22 December 1959) is a Mexican surgeon and politician from the National Action Party. Hernández served as Deputy of the LXI Legislature of the Mexican Congress representing Baja California from 2009 to 2012. He was named the Baja California secretary of health in 2014.

References

1959 births
Living people
People from Mexicali
National Action Party (Mexico) politicians
21st-century Mexican politicians
Politicians from Baja California
Mexican surgeons
Deputies of the LXI Legislature of Mexico
Members of the Chamber of Deputies (Mexico) for Baja California
Universidad Autónoma de Guadalajara alumni